Srikakulam Assembly constituency is a constituency in Srikakulam district of Andhra Pradesh. It is one of the seven assembly segments of Srikakulam Lok Sabha constituency, along with Ichchapuram, Palasa, Tekkali, Pathapatnam, Amadalavalasa and Narasannapeta. , there are a total of 255,177 electors in the constituency. In the 2019 state assembly elections, Dharmana Prasada Rao was elected as the MLA of the constituency, representing the YSR Congress Party.

Mandals 

The two mandals that form the assembly constituency..

Members of Legislative Assembly

Election results

1952

Assembly Elections 2004

Assembly elections 2009

Assembly elections 2014

Assembly elections 2019

See also 
 List of constituencies of the Andhra Pradesh Legislative Assembly

References 

Assembly constituencies of Andhra Pradesh